SNAV (Società Navigazione Alta Velocità) is an Italian company that operates ferry services from Italy to  Sardinia, Croatia and Sicily.

Routes 
SNAV operates a large network of routes across the Mediterranean and Adriatic.

Naples - Palermo / Pontine Islands / Aeolian Islands / Capri Islands
Split - Ancona / Stari Grad / Pescara

Current fleet 
SNAV operates a fleet of 8 high speed ferries and 2 hydrofoils.

Catamarans 

HSC SNAV Alcione
HSC Don Fransesco
HSC SNAV Altair
HSC SNAV Antares
HSC SNAV Aquarius
HSC SNAV Aquila
HSC SNAV Aries
HSC SNAV Orion

Hydrofoils
HF Superjumbo
 HF Snav Shaula

Photo gallery

References

Ferry companies of Italy
Ferry companies of Croatia